Saint Martin of Tours Parish is a territorial parish of the Diocese of San Jose in California. The parish is located in the Rose Garden neighborhood of San Jose, California, and also serves Catholics in the Winchester neighborhood.  It operates a transitional kindergarten through eighth grade school. The parish is named for Martin, Bishop of Tours.

External links

 Saint Martin of Tours Parish

Martin of Tours
Martin of Tours
Roman Catholic churches in San Jose, California